Ryūtarō, Ryutaro, Ryuutarou or Ryuutaroh is a masculine Japanese given name. Notable people with the name include:

, Japanese actor and model
, Japanese politician
, Japanese composer
, Japanese sport wrestler
, stage name Ryu, Japanese musician and DJ
, Japanese director and animator
, Japanese photographer
, Japanese film actor

See also
Ryutaros, a character from Kamen Rider Den-O
Ryōtarō

Japanese masculine given names